was the head of the Ueda Nagao clan following the Sengoku period of the 16th century of Japan.

References 

Samurai
1564 deaths
1526 births